The fifteenth edition of the South American Championship was held in Lima, Peru from 15 January to 12 February.

Overview

The participating countries were Chile, Ecuador, Paraguay, Peru, and Uruguay. Although CONMEBOL members since 1927, this tournament was the first time the Ecuadorian side participated. Colombia –member since 1936– withdrew again from the tournament, as well as Argentina, Bolivia and Brazil. Peru won for the first time.

Venues

Squads

Final round
Each team played against each of the other teams. Two points were awarded for a win, one point for a draw and zero points for a defeat.

Result

Goal scorers

7 goals
  Teodoro Fernández

5 goals

  Jorge Alcalde
  Severino Varela

3 goals

  Tiberio Godoy
  Marcial Barrios
  Pedro Lago
  Roberto Porta

2 goals

  José Avendaño
  Enrique Sorrel
  Marino Alcívar
  Manuel Arenas

1 goal

  Alfonso Domínguez
  Roberto Luco
  Raúl Muñoz
  Raúl Toro
  Ricardo Aquino
  Eustaquio Barreiro
  Eduardo Mingo
  Víctor Bielich
  Adelaido Camaití
  Oscar Chirimini

External links
 South American Championship 1939 at RSSSF

 
1939
1939
1939 in South American football
1939 in Peruvian football
1939 in Uruguayan football
1939 in Chilean football
1939 in Paraguayan football
1939 in Ecuador
January 1939 sports events
February 1939 sports events
Sports competitions in Lima
1930s in Lima